Kahil El'Zabar (born Clifton Blackburn; November 11, 1953) is an American jazz multi-instrumentalist (mainly a percussionist) and composer. He regularly records for Delmark Records.

Life and work
El'Zabar was born in Chicago, Illinois. He attended Lake Forest College and joined the Association for the Advancement of Creative Musicians (AACM) in the early 1970s, and became its chairman in 1975. During the 1970s, he formed the musical groups Ritual Trio and the Ethnic Heritage Ensemble, both of which remain active.  Musicians with whom Kahil EL'Zabar has collaborated include Dizzy Gillespie, Stevie Wonder, Nina Simone, Cannonball Adderley, Paul Simon, Pharoah Sanders, and Billy Bang.

In 2017 the film "Be Known - The Mystery of Kahil El Zabar" by filmmaker Dwayne Johnson-Cochran was released. The documentary follows El' Zabar and band on their 2007 Black History Month tour. The film has been available on Amazon Prime.

Discography (partial)

As leader/co-leader
 Golden Sea (Sound Aspects, 1989) - with David Murray
 Return of the Lost Tribe (Delmark, 1998) as Bright Moments with Joseph Jarman, Kalaparusha Maurice McIntyre, Malachi Favors and Adegoke Steve Colson 
 One World Family (CIMP, 2000) - with David Murray
 Spirits Entering (Delmark, 2001) - with Billy Bang
 Love Outside of Dreams (Delmark, 2002) - with David Murray, Fred Hopkins
 We Is (Delmark, 2004) - with David Murray
 Transmigration (Delmark, 2007) 
 What It Is! (Delmark, 2013)
 Kahil El’Zabar’s Spirit Groove (Spiritmuse, 2020) - with David Murray
 Kahil El'Zabar's America the Beautiful (Spiritmuse, 2020)

With Ethnic Heritage Ensemble
 Three Gentlemen From Chicago (Moers Music, 1981)
 Impressions (Red Records, 1982)
 Welcome (Leo Records, 1984)
 Ancestral Song (Silkheart, 1988)
 Hang Tuff (Open Minds, 1991) with Joseph Bowie, Edward Wilkerson
 Dance with the Ancestors (Chameleon, 1993)
 21st Century Union March (Silkheart, 1997) with Joseph Bowie, Edward Wilkerson
 The Continuum (Delmark, 1997)
 Papa's Bounce (CIMP, 1998) with Joseph Bowie, Ernest Dawkins, Atu Harold Murray
 Freedom Jazz Dance (Delmark, 1999) with Fareed Haque
 Ka-Real (Silkheart, 1997 [2000])
 Hot 'N' Heavy (Delmark, 2007)
 Mama's House (Katalyst, 2009)
 Black is Back (Katalyst, 2014)
 Be Known Ancient/Future/Music (Spiritmuse, 2019)

With Ritual Trio
 The Ritual (Sound Aspects, 1985)
 Sacred Love (Sound Aspects, 1985) - with 
 Another Kind of Groove (Sound Aspects, 1986) - with Billy Bang
 Alika Rising (Sound Aspects, 1990)
 Renaissance of the Resistance (Delmark, 1994)
 Big Cliff (Delmark, 1995) - with Billy Bang
 Jitterbug Junction (CIMP, 1997) with Ari Brown, Malachi Favors
 Conversations (Delmark, 1999) - with Archie Shepp, Ari Brown, Malachi Favors 
 Africa N'Da Blues (Delmark, 2000) - with Archie Shepp, Ari Brown, Malachi Favors, Pharoah Sanders 
 Live at the River East Art Center (Delmark, 2005) - with Billy Bang
 Big M: A Tribute to Malachi Favors (Delmark, 2006) - with Billy Bang
 Ooh Live (Bright Moments, 2008) - with Pharoah Sanders
 The Ancestors Are Amongst Us (Katalyst, 2010) - with Lester Bowie
 Follow the Sun (Delmark, 2013)

With Tri-Factor
 The Power (CIMP, 2000) - with Hamiet Bluiett, Billy Bang
 If You Believe (8th Harmonic Breakdown, 2002)

With Kahil El'Zabar Quartet
 A Time For Healing (Spiritmuse, 2022)

As sideman
With David Murray
A Sanctuary Within (Black Saint, 1991)
The Tip (DIW, 1994)
Jug-A-Lug (DIW, 1994)
With Wadada Leo Smith
Procession of the Great Ancestry (Nessa, 1989)

References

External links

Delmark Records: Interview with Kahil EL'Zabar

Kahil EL'Zabar's Ritual Trio in Salzburg, Austria

1953 births
African-American drummers
American jazz composers
American male jazz composers
American jazz drummers
American jazz percussionists
Avant-garde jazz musicians
CIMP artists
Delmark Records artists
Lake Forest College alumni
Living people
Musicians from Chicago
20th-century American drummers
American male drummers
Jazz musicians from Illinois
20th-century American male musicians
Ethnic Heritage Ensemble members
20th-century African-American musicians
21st-century African-American people